Ashok Nagar Assembly constituency is one of the 230 Vidhan Sabha (Legislative Assembly) constituencies of Madhya Pradesh state in central India. This constituency is reserved for the candidates belonging to the Scheduled castes since 2008, following the delimitation of the Legislative Assembly constituencies. It came into existence in 1957, as one of the Vidhan Sabha constituencies of Madhya Pradesh state.

Overview
Ashok Nagar (constituency number 32) is one of the 3 Vidhan Sabha constituencies located in Ashok Nagar district. This constituency presently covers the entire Ashok Nagar tehsil of the district.

Ashok Nagar is part of Guna Lok Sabha constituency along with seven other Vidhan Sabha segments, namely, Chanderi and Mungaoli in this district, Bamori and in Guna in Guna district, Shivpuri, Pichhore and Kolaras in Shivpuri district.

Members of Legislative Assembly
As a double member constituency:
 1957: Ram Dayal Singh, Indian National Congress / Dulichand, Indian National Congress
As a single member constituency:
 1962: Ram Dayal Singh, Indian National Congress
 1967: Multanmal, Swatantra Party
 1972: Mahendra Singh, Bharatiya Jana Sangh
 1977: Chiman Lal Guljarilal, Janata Party
 1980: Mahender Singh, Indian National Congress (I)
 1985: Ravindra Singh, Indian National Congress
 1990: Neelam Singh Yadav, Bharatiya Janata Party
 1993: Neelam Singh Yadav, Bharatiya Janata Party
 1998: Balveer Singh Kushawah, Bahujan Samaj Party
 2003: Jagannath Singh Raghuwanshi, Bharatiya Janata Party
 2008: Ladduram Kori, Bharatiya Janata Party
 2013: Gopilal Jatav, Bharatiya Janta Party
 2018: Jaipal Singh Jajji, Indian National Congress

See also
 Ashoknagar (disambiguation)

References

Ashoknagar district
Assembly constituencies of Madhya Pradesh